Brachodes metaspila is a moth of the family Brachodidae. It is found in South Africa.

References

Moths described in 1926
Brachodidae